Pak Chol (born 8 November 1990) is a North Korean long-distance runner. He represents the Sajabong Sports Team.

Pak won the Pyongyang Marathon on 13 April 2014 with a personal best of 2:12:26. The winning time was an improvement of more than a minute from his previous personal best which earned him the fifth place in the same race in 2013. In 2015, he came second in the 15th Asian Marathon Championship in Hong Kong with a season's best of 2:16:09. He took part in the marathon at the 2015 World Championships in Beijing the same year and placed 11th with a time of 2:15:44, a new season's best.

In 2016 Pak Chol won the Pyongyang Mangyongdae Marathon in a time of 2:14:11.  He then went on to represent his country in the men's marathon at the 2016 Rio de Janeiro Olympic Games.  Pak Chol placed 27th in 2:15:27; the race was won by Kenya's Eliud Kipchoge in 2:08:44.

In 2017 Pak successfully defended his title, winning the Pyongyang Mangyongdae Prize Marathon in 2:14:56. In November Pak Chol competed in the Asian Marathon Championships in Dongguan, China.  He finished 4th in a time of 2:16:19.

In 2018 Pak Chol represented his country at the 2018 Asian Games in Jakarta, Indonesia in the men's marathon.  He finished 10th in 2:36:22.

Achievements

References

External links

1990 births
Living people
Place of birth missing (living people)
North Korean male marathon runners
World Athletics Championships athletes for North Korea
Athletes (track and field) at the 2014 Asian Games
Athletes (track and field) at the 2018 Asian Games
Asian Games competitors for North Korea